Saint-Jean is a town in the Saint-Jean-du-Sud commune of the Port-Salut Arrondissement, in the Sud department of Haiti. In 2009, it had 939 inhabitants.

See also
Saint-Jean-du-Sud, for a list of other settlements in the commune.

References

Populated places in Sud (department)